Gymnopilus subsapineus is a species of mushroom-forming fungus in the family Hymenogastraceae.

Description

Habitat and distribution
Gymnopilus subsapineus has been found growing on rotting wood in Oregon, during October.

See also

List of Gymnopilus species

References

subsapineus
Fungi of North America
Fungi described in 1969
Taxa named by Lexemuel Ray Hesler